Insect pins are used by entomologists for mounting collected insects.
They can also be used in dressmaking for very fine silk or antique fabrics.

They were once commonly made from brass or silver, but these would corrode from contact with insect bodies and are no longer commonly used.
Instead they are nickel-plated brass, yielding "white" or "black" enameling, or even made from stainless steel.
Similarly, the smallest sizes from 000 to 1 used to be impractical for mounting until plastic and polyethylene became commonly used for pinning bases.

minutens are headless micropins that are generally only made of stainless steel, used for double-mounting, where the insect is mounted on the minuten, which is pinned to a small block of soft material, which is in turn mounted on a standard, larger, insect pin.

References

Cross-reference

Sources 

 
 
 
 
 

Entomology equipment